Westel may refer to:

 Westel Willoughby, Jr.
  Westel W. Willoughby
 short name of Western Telesystems Ltd
 a former name of Hungarian T-Mobile